Arnošt Konstantin Růžička (21 December 1761, Tloskov – 18 March 1845, České Budějovice) was the second bishop of České Budějovice, after the seat had been vacant since 1813.

Life
He was ordained priest in Prague on 15 July 1785, before serving as vice rector and then rector of the General Seminary in Galician Lviv. He was made a canon in České Budějovice on 20 July 1794 and was made vicar general to bishop Johann Prokop Schaffgotsch on 12 October 1797. After Schaffgotsch died in 1813, the see fell vacant and Růžička acted as its administrator.

On 15 June 1815 Francis II of Austria nominated him as bishop of Budweis, with papal confirmation from Pope Pius VII following on 25 August 1816. He was consecrated bishop in St Ursula's Church in Prague by Archbishop Wenzel Leopold Chlumčanský of Přestavlk and enthroned on 22 September 1816 in České Budějovice. He remained bishop for almost thirty years and was buried in the church cemetery of St. Prokop buried in Budweis.

References

Sources
http://www.catholic-hierarchy.org/bishop/bruzi.html 

1761 births
1845 deaths
People from Benešov District
Bishops of České Budějovice
19th-century Roman Catholic bishops in Austria-Hungary